The 2015 Penn Quakers football team represented the University of Pennsylvania during the 2015 NCAA Division I FCS football season. They were led by first-year head coach Ray Priore and played their home games at Franklin Field. They were a member of the Ivy League. They finished the season 7–3 overall 6–1 in Ivy League play to place in a three-way tie for the Ivy League title with Dartmouth and Harvard. Penn averaged 6,048 fans per gam.

Schedule

References

Penn
Penn Quakers football seasons
Ivy League football champion seasons
Penn Quakers football